"The Little Mermaid" is a fairy tale by Hans Christian Andersen.

The Little Mermaid may also refer to:
The Little Mermaid (statue), in Copenhagen
The Little Mermaid, a symbol featured in the coat of arms of Warsaw, Poland

Film, television, theatre
The Little Mermaid (1968 film),  a Russian animated 29-minute film
Hans Christian Andersen's The Little Mermaid (1975 film), a Japanese anime film
The Little Mermaid (1975 Canadian film), an animated 30-minute film produced by Gerald Potterton 
The Little Mermaid (1976 Czech film), a live-action film directed by Karel Kachyňa
The Little Mermaid (1976 Russian film), a live-action film directed by Vladimir Bychkov 
"The Little Mermaid" (Faerie Tale Theatre), a live-action television episode
The Little Mermaid (franchise), comprising:
The Little Mermaid (1989 film), an animated film from Walt Disney Pictures
The Little Mermaid (TV series), based on the Disney film
The Little Mermaid (video game), based on the Disney film
 The Little Mermaid II: Return to the Sea, a 2000 direct-to-video sequel to the Disney film
 The Little Mermaid: Ariel's Beginning, a 2008 direct-to-video prequel to the Disney film
 The Little Mermaid (musical), based on Disney's animated film
The Little Mermaid Live!, a 2019 musical television special based on the Disney film
The Little Mermaid (2023 film) a live-action film adaptation of the Disney original
Saban's Adventures of the Little Mermaid, a 1991 Japanese anime TV series by Fuji Eight
The Little Mermaid, an animated film released in 1993 as a Golden Films title 
The Little Mermaid (2005 ballet), music by Lera Auerbach, choreography by John Neumeier
The Little Mermaid (2017 ballet), music by Sally Beamish
The Little Mermaid (2018 film), a live-action film directed by Blake Harris

Music
The Little Mermaid (soundtrack), for the 1989 Disney film
The Little Mermaid: Songs from the Sea, original songs inspired by the Disney film
Disney's The Little Mermaid (2008 album), the original Broadway cast recording of the Disney musical
Die Seejungfrau, a symphonic poem written in 1903 by Alexander von Zemlinsky

Other 
 Little Mermaid (comics), either of two heroines in the Global Guardians team from DC Comics
 The Little Mermaid: Ariel's Undersea Adventure, an attraction at Disney's California Adventure park and Disney's Magic Kingdom Park
 La Sirenita, a professional wrestler

See also
Mermaid (disambiguation)